Eugeniusz Michalak (28 October 1908 – 22 July 1988) was a Polish cyclist. He competed in the individual and team road race events at the 1928 Summer Olympics.

References

External links
 

1908 births
1988 deaths
Polish male cyclists
Olympic cyclists of Poland
Cyclists at the 1928 Summer Olympics
Cyclists from Warsaw
20th-century Polish people